Saint Hripsime Church (Surp Hripsime Yekeghetsi), is a working Armenian church located in Yalta on the Crimean peninsula,Ukraine and completed in 1917.

It is modeled after a church of the same name in Vagharshapat, Armenia. In fact, a piece of that UNESCO World Heritage site church was symbolically used in the base of this church.

References 

 

Armenian culture
Armenian Apostolic Church
Armenian Apostolic churches
Armenian Apostolic monasteries
Armenian Apostolic churches in Ukraine
Buildings and structures in Yalta
1917 establishments in Europe
Tourist attractions in Crimea
Churches completed in 1917
Cultural heritage monuments of regional significance in Crimea
Churches in Crimea